František Hossa (born 13 September 1954) is a Slovak former ice hockey player and the current head coach of Spartak Moscow of the KHL. Both his sons, Marián and Marcel, are professional ice hockey players. As of 2002, he is also the assistant coach of the Slovakia men's national ice hockey team.

References

External links

1954 births
Slovak ice hockey defencemen
Slovak ice hockey coaches
HK Dukla Trenčín players
People from Spišská Nová Ves District
Sportspeople from the Košice Region
Living people
Slovakia men's national ice hockey team coaches
Czechoslovak ice hockey defencemen
Slovak expatriate ice hockey people
Slovak expatriate ice hockey players in Russia